Shumkovo is a rural locality (a village) in Vsevolodo-Vilvenskoye Urban Settlement, Alexandrovsky District, Perm Krai, Russia. The population was 4 as of 2010.

Geography 
Shumkovo is located 36 km west of Alexandrovsk (the district's administrative centre) by road. Garnovo is the nearest rural locality.

References 

Rural localities in Alexandrovsky District